Generally, a battle is a combat in warfare between two or more parties.

Battle or battles may also refer to:

Military
 Battle (formation), a military formation or subdivision of troops
 Battle-class destroyer, a class of 26 destroyers of the Royal Navy and Royal Australian Navy
 Fairey Battle, a light bomber of the Royal Air Force built by Fairey Aviation in the late 1930s
 List of battles, a partial list of battles that have entries in Wikipedia

Places
 Battle, East Sussex, England
 Battle, Powys, Wales
 Battle, Reading, England
 Battle, Wyoming, United States
 Battle Harbour, Newfoundland, Canada

Music
 Battles (band), an experimental rock band featuring Ian Williams and John Stanier
 Battle (South Korean band), a Korean boy band
 Battle (UK band), an indie rock band from Surrey, England
 The Battle (George Jones album), a 1976 country music album by George Jones
 The Battle (Allen-Lande album), a power metal album by Symphony X vocalist Russell Allen and Masterplan vocalist Jørn Lande
 Battles (album), a 2016 album by metal band In Flames
 "Battle" (song), a 2000 song by Wookie
 "The Battle" (George Jones song), 1976
 "Battles" (La'Porsha Renae song)
 "Battles", a song by The Afters from their album Live On Forever
 "Battle", a song by Blur from their album 13
 "Battle", a song by Colbie Caillat from her album Coco
 "Battle", a song by Patrick Wolf from his album The Bachelor
 "The Battle", a song by Strawbs from their debut album Strawbs
 "Battle", an instrumental song by Wolfstone from their EP Burning Horizons
 "the battell", part of the 1591 collection of keyboard pieces My Ladye Nevells Booke by William Byrd

Film, television and written fiction
 Battle (2018 film), directed by Katarina Launing
 "The Battle" (Star Trek: The Next Generation), a Season 1 episode of Star Trek: The Next Generation
 The Battle (1911 film), directed by D.W. Griffith
 The Battle (1923 film), directed by Sessue Hayakawa and Édouard-Émile Violet
 The Battle (1934 film), also known as Thunder in the East
 The Battle (Rambaud novel), 1997 French novel La Bataille by Patrick Rambaud; winner of that year's Prix Goncourt
 The Battle (Kluge novel), 1964 German novel Schlachtbeschreibung

Other fields
 Battle (surname), a list of persons with the surname Battle or Battles
 Battle.net, an online gaming service
 The Battle (boxing), a WBA welterweight title bout between Miguel Cotto and Antonio Margarito
 Freestyle battle, a contest in which two or more rappers compete or battle each other using freestyle rap

See also
 Battle Creek (disambiguation)
 Battle Lake (disambiguation)
 Battle River (disambiguation)
 Battle Royale (disambiguation)
 Justice Battle (disambiguation)
 Battlefield (disambiguation)
 
 Battel (disambiguation)
 Battell
 Battelle (disambiguation)
 Battler (disambiguation)